The 2018–19 Vivo Pro Kabaddi League was the sixth season of Pro Kabaddi League, a professional kabaddi league in India since 2014. The season began on 7 October 2018 and concluded on 5 January 2019.

Bengaluru Bulls defeated Gujarat Fortune Giants in the final match to win their maiden title.

Stadiums And Locations Of Teams

Personnel and sponsorship

Foreign Players
Each team can sign maximum 3 foreign players in the squad.

Sponsorship 
Title Sponsor
 Vivo
Powered by
 Thums Up Charged

Associate Sponsors
 Bajaj Electricals
 Tata Motors
 Honda
 Gillette Mach3
 Dream11

Partners
 RR Kabel
 UltraTech Cement
 Britannia
 McDowell's No.1
 HDFC Life

Broadcast Sponsor
Star Sports

Points Table

Tournament Statistics

Best Raiders

Best defenders

League stage 
Source:prokabaddi.com

Leg 1 – Jawaharlal Nehru Indoor Stadium, Chennai

Leg 2 – Motilal Nehru School of Sports, Sonepat

Leg 3 – Shree Shiv Chhatrapati Sports Complex, Pune

Leg 4 – Patliputra Sports Complex, Patna

Leg 5 – Shaheed Vijay Singh Pathik Sports Complex, Greater Noida

Leg 6 – Dome@NSCI SVP Stadium, Mumbai

Leg 7 – The Arena, Ahmedabad

Leg 8 – Shree Shiv Chhatrapati Sports Complex, Pune

Leg 9 – Thyagaraj Sports Complex, New Delhi

Leg 10 – Rajiv Gandhi Indoor Stadium, Vizag

Leg 11 – Tau Devilal Sports Complex, Panchkula

Leg 12 – Netaji Subhas Chandra Bose Indoor Stadium, Kolkata

Playoffs

Bracket

Eliminator 1 – Rajiv Gandhi Indoor Stadium, Kochi

Eliminator 2 – Rajiv Gandhi Indoor Stadium, Kochi

Qualifier 1 – Rajiv Gandhi Indoor Stadium, Kochi

Eliminator 3 – Rajiv Gandhi Indoor Stadium, Kochi

Qualifier 2 – Dome@NSCI SVP Stadium, Mumbai

Final – Dome@NSCI SVP Stadium, Mumbai

References

External links
 Pro Kabaddi 2018 Live Tv Channels 
 Pro Kabaddi 2019 Updates

Pro Kabaddi League seasons
Pro Kabaddi League
Pro Kabaddi League